HBX may refer to:
 HBx, a hepatitis B viral protein
 Harvard Business X, a program of Harvard Business School
 Harz-Berlin-Express, a German train
 High Blast Explosive
 Hubli Airport, in Karnataka, India